
Olivio is a defunct restaurant in Harderwijk, Netherlands. It was a fine dining restaurant that was awarded one Michelin star in 2002 and retained that rating until 2005.

Head chef of the restaurant was Wim Zwaart.

See also
List of Michelin starred restaurants in the Netherlands

References 

Restaurants in the Netherlands
Michelin Guide starred restaurants in the Netherlands
Defunct restaurants in the Netherlands
Defunct French restaurants